Elizabeth Andrew (born 2 November 1971) is a former Australian rugby union player. She made her international debut for Australia in 1994 against New Zealand in Sydney. She was a member of the Wallaroos first Rugby World Cup squad in 1998 in the Netherlands.

Andrew was also named in the 2002 Rugby World Cup squad that competed in Spain. Her last appearance for the Wallaroos was in the match against Scotland, in Girona.

References 

1971 births
Living people
Australian female rugby union players
Australia women's international rugby union players